Illegal agent may refer to:
Non-official cover, an espionage operative without official government links who assume covert roles
Illegals Program, a specific group of Russian espionage operatives, arrested in the United States in 2010